Sportsman may refer to an outdoorsman, someone who participates in outdoor sporting activities such as hunting, fishing, climbing, and horseback riding.

It may also refer to:

 Sportsperson, someone who competes in athletics
 Sportsmanship, conforming to all the rules of game and acting in a fair manner towards the opponent
 Sportsman's Association, a UK gun rights group
 Sportsman of the Year, an award given by Sports Illustrated magazine since 1954
 The Sportsman (1865 newspaper), a British newspaper, in print until 1924
 The Sportsman (2006 newspaper), a British newspaper, in print from March to October 2006
 The Sportsman (Melbourne), an Australian newspaper, in print from 1881 to 1904
 The Sportsman (UK broadcaster), UK based online sports broadcaster
 The Sportsman, a passenger train of the Chesapeake and Ohio Railway from Washington, DC to Cincinnati, OH and Detroit, MI via Huntington, WV and Columbus, OH
 Sportsman Channel, a US cable channel devoted to hunting and fishing
 Acme Sportsman, an American light aircraft built in 1928
 Dodge Sportsman, a Dodge B-series van manufactured from 1971 to 1979
 Glasair Sportsman 2+2, an American kit aircraft design
 Remington Sportsman 48, a Remington Arms shotgun
 Sportsman's Park, a baseball stadium in St. Louis, Missouri
 Sportsman Airpark, an airport in Oregon